Statistics of Emperor's Cup in the 1995 season.

Overview
It was contested by 32 teams, and Nagoya Grampus Eight won the championship.

Results

1st round
Yokohama Marinos 3–2 Honda
Fujitsu 2–5 Fukuoka Blux
Cerezo Osaka 2–0 Hannan University
Tokyo Gas 0–1 Kashima Antlers
Júbilo Iwata 5–1 Hiroshima University
Vissel Kobe 2–0 Shimizu S-Pulse
Yokohama Flügels 3–2 Tosu Futures
Kyoto Purple Sanga 1–2 Nagoya Grampus Eight
Urawa Red Diamonds 2–0 Sapporo University
Toshiba 1–2 Kashiwa Reysol
Gamba Osaka 3–1 Hokuriku Electric Power
Brummell Sendai 2–1 JEF United Ichihara
Bellmare Hiratsuka 3–0 Nippon Denso
Komazawa University 2–3 Sanfrecce Hiroshima
Seino Transportation SC 0–2 Tsukuba University
Otsuka Pharmaceutical 0–1 Verdy Kawasaki

2nd round
Yokohama Marinos 0–1 Fukuoka Blux
Cerezo Osaka 1–2 Kashima Antlers
Júbilo Iwata 0–2 Vissel Kobe
Yokohama Flügels 1–4 Nagoya Grampus Eight
Urawa Red Diamonds 1–0 Kashiwa Reysol
Gamba Osaka 4–1 Brummell Sendai
Bellmare Hiratsuka 0–1 Sanfrecce Hiroshima
Tsukuba University 0–4 Verdy Kawasaki

Quarterfinals
Fukuoka Blux 2–3 Kashima Antlers
Vissel Kobe 0–2 Nagoya Grampus Eight
Urawa Red Diamonds 1–2 Gamba Osaka
Sanfrecce Hiroshima 1–0 Verdy Kawasaki

Semifinals
Kashima Antlers 1–5 Nagoya Grampus Eight
Gamba Osaka 1–2 Sanfrecce Hiroshima

Final

Nagoya Grampus Eight 3–0 Sanfrecce Hiroshima
Nagoya Grampus Eight won the championship.

References
 NHK

Emperor's Cup
Emperor's Cup
1996 in Japanese football